A statue in Carrara marble of Benjamin Franklin by Jacques Jouvenal stands outside the Old Post Office Pavilion, at 12th Street and Pennsylvania Avenue NW in Washington, D.C.

A gift of Stilson Hutchins, a founder of The Washington Post, it was dedicated on January 17, 1889, at 10th Street and Pennsylvania Avenue. It was moved to its current site in 1980.

See also
 Benjamin Franklin in popular culture
 List of public art in Washington, D.C., Ward 6

References

External links
 

1889 establishments in Washington, D.C.
1889 sculptures
Franklin
Historic district contributing properties in Washington, D.C.
Marble sculptures in Washington, D.C.
Relocated buildings and structures in Washington, D.C.
Washington, D.C.
Franklin